Scopula usticinctaria is a moth of the  family Geometridae. It is found on Borneo and Peninsular Malaysia.

Adults have very dark red margins on both wings.

References

Moths described in 1861
usticinctaria
Moths of Asia